The Lines Are Open is the second and final album by The Arrows released in 1985.  Producer David Tyson was again nominated for the Juno Award for "Producer of the Year", for his work on this album.

The album title is a line from the last song titled "Hampton Avenue".  Overall, the album has a more serious tone than the previous one and musically it features a number of tracks with a horn section.  This would be the last album from The Arrows - lead vocalist and songwriter Dean McTaggart would go on to write hit songs for other artists including Amanda Marshall.

Track listing 
"Heart of the City"
"Talk Talk"
"Bad Reputation"
"Tell It to My Heart"
"Wild One"
"I Told You So"
"Chains"
"I Can't Let Go"
"Hampton Avenue"

Singles
The following Canadian singles were released from the album:
 "Talk Talk" (#47, December 1985)
 "Heart of the City" (#57, March 1986)
 "Chains" (#93, May 1986)

Album credits

Personnel
Dean McTaggart - vocals, background vocals
Doug Macaskill - guitars
Rob Gusevs - keyboards
Earl Seymour - saxophones, steiner woodwind synthesizer
Bobby Economou - drums
Glenn Olive - bass guitar
Rick Waychenko - trumpet
Steve McDade - trumpet
Vernon Dorge - alto saxophone
Memo Acevedo - percussion
Gerald O'Brien - emulator programming
Sharon Lee Williams - background vocals
Charity Brown - background vocals
John Rutledge - background vocals
David Blamires - background vocals
David Tyson - background vocals

Production
David Tyson - producer, arrangement
The Arrows - arrangement
Lindsay Kidd - engineer
Bob Rock - mixing engineer, at Little Mountain Sound, Vancouver
Larry Alexander - mixing engineer on "Talk Talk", at The Power Station, New York City
David Moore - executive producer
Hugh Syme and Dimo Safari - art direction and photography

1985 albums